Richard Colman (c. 1633–1672), of Lincoln's Inn and Melchet Park, Wiltshire, was an English Member of Parliament for Salisbury 8 February 1665 to 13 October 1672.

References

1630s births
1672 deaths
English MPs 1661–1679
Members of Lincoln's Inn
Members of Parliament for Salisbury
People from Wiltshire